Loncastuximab tesirine, sold under the brand name Zynlonta, is a monoclonal antibody conjugate medication used to treat large B-cell lymphoma and high-grade B-cell lymphoma. It is an antibody-drug conjugate (ADC) composed of a humanized antibody targeting the protein CD19.

The most common side effects include increased levels of gamma-glutamyltransferase (GGT, a liver enzyme), neutropenia (low levels of neutrophils, a type of white blood cell), tiredness, anemia (low levels of red blood cells), thrombocytopenia (low levels of blood platelets), nausea (feeling sick), peripheral edema (swelling due to fluid retention, especially of the ankles and feet) and rash.

Loncastuximab tesirine was approved for medical use in the United States in April 2021, and in the European Union in December 2022. The US Food and Drug Administration (FDA) considers it to be a first-in-class medication.

Medical uses 
Loncastuximab tesirine is indicated for the treatment of adults with relapsed or refractory large B-cell lymphoma and high-grade B-cell lymphoma.

Technology 
The humanized monoclonal antibody is stochastically conjugated via a valine-alanine cleavable, maleimide linker to a cytotoxic (anticancer) pyrrolobenzodiazepine (PBD) dimer. The antibody binds to CD19, a protein which is highly expressed on the surface of B-cell hematological tumors including certain forms of lymphomas and leukemias. After binding to the tumor cells the antibody is internalized, the cytotoxic drug PBD is released and the cancer cells are killed. PBD dimers are generated out of PBD monomers, a class of natural products produced by various actinomycetes. PBD dimers work by crosslinking specific sites of the DNA, blocking the cancer cells’ division that cause the cells to die. As a class of DNA-crosslinking agents they are significantly more potent than systemic chemotherapeutic drugs.

History 
Two phase I trials are evaluating the medication in people with relapsed or refractory B-cell non-Hodgkin’s lymphoma and relapsed or refractory B-cell acute lymphoblastic leukemia. At the 14th International Conference on Malignant Lymphoma interim results from a Phase I, open-label, dose-escalating study designed to evaluate the treatment of loncastuximab tesirine in relapsed or refractory non-Hodgkin’s lymphoma were presented. Among the patients enrolled at the time of the data cutoff the overall response rate was 61% in the total patient population (42% complete response and 19% partial response) and in patients with relapsing or refractory diffuse large B-cell lymphoma (DLBCL) the overall response rate was 57% (43% complete response and 14% partial response).

Loncastuximab tesirine was granted orphan drug designation by the FDA for the treatment of diffuse large B-cell lymphoma.

Society and culture

Legal status 
On 15 September 2022, the Committee for Medicinal Products for Human Use (CHMP) of the European Medicines Agency (EMA) adopted a positive opinion, recommending the granting of a marketing authorization for the medicinal product Zynlonta, intended for the treatment of adults with diffuse large B-cell lymphoma (DLBCL) and high-grade B-cell lymphoma (HGBL). The applicant for this medicinal product is ADC Therapeutics (NL) B.V. Loncastuximab tesirine was approved for medical use in the European Union in December 2022.

Research 
Given its mechanism of action, loncastiximab tesirinine may be appealing in patients ineligible for CAR-T cell therapy.

References

External links 
 
 
 
 

Antibody-drug conjugates
Monoclonal antibodies for tumors
Orphan drugs